Echiniscus madonnae is a tardigrade species, genus of Echiniscus. It was described by Polish zoologists Michalczyk and Kaczmarek Łukasz in South America in 2006, and named in honor of American singer-songwriter Madonna.

Etymology
Echiniscus madonnae was described by Polish zoologists Michalczyk and Kaczmarek Łukasz and published in the international journal of animal taxonomy Zootaxa in March 2006 (Vol. 1154, pp. 1–36). The species was named in honor of American singer Madonna. The scientifics stated: "We take great pleasure in dedicating this species to one of the most significant artists of our times, Madonna Louise Veronica Ritchie".

Description
So far it is the only species within the Echiniscus bigranulatus group that does not have true pores in the dorsal plate cuticle.

Habitat
Echiniscus madonnae is found in Chile (Ancash, near Huaraz), mainly mosses on rocks and in Colombia (Magdalena and Sierra Nevada de Santa Marta), in lichen of sub-andean forests. It was also found in Peru. This species belongs to a Neotropical and Antarctic bigranulatus group.

See also 
 List of organisms named after famous people (born 1950–present)

References

External links
Echiniscus madonnae at Animal Diversity Web
Echiniscus madonnae at Encyclopedia of Life (EOL)

madonnae
Animals described in 2006
Cultural depictions of Madonna